The 1927 Kentucky Derby was the 53rd running of the Kentucky Derby. The race was run on May 14, 1927. Whiskery was the winner after defeating Osmand by a nose in the stretch.

Payout
The Kentucky Derby Payout Schedule

Field

 Winning Breeder: Harry Payne Whitney; (KY)
Margins – Head
Time – 2:06
Track – Slow
Horses Saxon, My Son, and Mr. Kirkwood were scratched before the race.

References

Kentucky Derby races
Kentucky Derby, 1927
Derby
Kentucky Derby